Zaval (also Romanized as Zavāl; also known as Shīb Zavāl) is a village in Rostam-e Yek Rural District, in the Central District of Rostam County, Fars Province, Iran. At the 2006 census, its population was 206, in 42 families.

References 

Populated places in Rostam County